She Loves Me Not may refer to:
She Loves Me Not (1918 film), a 1918 film
She Loves Me Not (1934 film), a 1934 film starring Miriam Hopkins and Bing Crosby
She Loves Me Not, a 1987 album by Alan Rankine
"She Loves Me Not" (Faith No More song), a 1997 song by Faith No More
"She Loves Me Not" (song), a 2002 single by Papa Roach

See also
 
 Love Me, Love Me Not (disambiguation)
 He loves me... he loves me not
 She Loves Me, She Loves Me Not, album by Kiss It Goodbye
 "Loves Me Not", tATu single
 Love Me Not, Korean film